Hans Ditlev Bendixsen (October 14, 1842 – February 12, 1902) was a Danish-American  shipbuilder who was instrumental in the development of the  merchant marine industry on the West Coast of the United States. His lumber schooners were built in or near Eureka, California in shipyards on Humboldt Bay for over 30 years. These schooners played a major role in the historic west coast lumber trade.

Background
Hans Ditlev Bendixsen  was born in Thisted of Region Nordjylland, Denmark, the son of Frederik Carl Bendixsen, a tobacco merchant and Mariane von Mehren Bendixsen, both members of prominent Danish families. Bendixsen was apprenticed to the shipbuilders' trade in Aalborg for two years, When he had completed his apprenticeship he worked at various shipyards in Copenhagen, after which he went to sea as a ship carpenter.

Career
Bendixsen came to California via Cape Horn, and found employment in Turner's shipyard, at San Francisco, until the year 1867, at which time he came to Eureka, California. He entered the employ of E. Cousins' shipyard, prior to beginning shipbuilding independently. From Eureka, Bendixsen moved his shipyard to nearby Fairhaven, California. Spread out over fourteen acres were shops, sawmills, slips, timber yards, and even cottages and gardens for 150 workers. 

Often, Bendixsen owned shares in Bendixsen-built ships—vessels plying the coast with lumber or trading out to the sugar islands. After many good years, an economic crisis within the lumber industry in 1877 forced Bendixsen to sell his shipyard so that he could pay his employees and creditors. He rented the shipyard from the new owners and continued to build ships. Seven years later he was able to buy back the shipyard.

Between 1875 and 1901 he launched 50 three and four-mast schooners and barkentines at his Fairhaven yard, and in his lifetime built some 115 vessels of all types including two-mast schooners, South Sea schooner and brigantines, and steamboats. Bendixsen is best remembered for the three, four, and five-mast schooners he built for the west coast lumber trade.  In 1901 he sold his shipbuilding plant for close to a quarter-million dollars.

Legacy
Certain of Bendixsen's lumber schooners have survived into the 21st century.  The Wawona, built in 1897,  was berthed at South Lake Union Park in Seattle. The Wawona was hauled to the Puget Sound Shipyard on March 4, 2009 and has since been dismantled.
A surviving Hans Bendixsen vessel is the C.A. Thayer,  built in 1895, located at San Francisco Maritime National Historical Park. The C.A. Thayer has been restored and sailed back to the Hyde Street Pier on April 12, 2007.

References

Further reading
 Biography of Bendixsen, histories of Wawona and C.A. Thayer. Also includes data on Bendixsen ships, p. 136-162.

Haugan, Jevne  (1999) Sailing with the Winds of History: A Pacific Coast Chronicle (AuthorHouse)

External links
C.A.Thayer (Schooner)
Biography
 Bendixsen Shipbuilding, Fairhaven CA 

1842 births
1902 deaths
Danish emigrants to the United States
American shipbuilders
Maritime history of California
Ships built in Eureka, California
History of Humboldt County, California
People from Eureka, California
People from Thisted